Pedro Soares may refer to:

Pedro Soares de Sousa (16th century), third Donatary-Captain for the island of Santa Maria
Pedro Soares (judoka) (born 1974), Portuguese judoka
Pedro Mota Soares (born 1974), Portuguese politician
Pedro Filipe Soares (born 1979), Portuguese politician
Pedro Soares (footballer, born 1987), Portuguese football goalkeeper
Pedro Soares (footballer, born 1999), Portuguese football midfielder
Pedro dos Santos Soares (born 1915), Portuguese communist

See also
Pedro Soares Muñoz (1916-1991), Brazilian politician